Blues Jam in Chicago is a recording by the British rock band Fleetwood Mac, originally released in two single-LP volumes by Blue Horizon in December 1969. It was the result of a recording session in early 1969 at Chess Records in Chicago with Fleetwood Mac, then a young British blues band, and a number of famous Chicago blues artists from whom they drew inspiration.  The album has also been released, with slightly different track listings, under the titles Blues Jam at Chess Volumes One and Two and Fleetwood Mac in Chicago, the latter by Sire Records in 1976.

The members of Fleetwood Mac at the time of this recording were Peter Green (guitar, vocals), Jeremy Spencer (guitar, vocals), Danny Kirwan (guitar, vocals), Mick Fleetwood, (drums), and John McVie (bass guitar).  The Chicago blues musicians who played at this session were Otis Spann (piano, vocals), Willie Dixon (upright bass), Shakey Horton (harmonica, vocals), J.T. Brown (tenor saxophone, vocals), Buddy Guy (guitar), Honeyboy Edwards (guitar, vocals), and S.P. Leary (drums).

In December 2022, a book of Jeff Lowenthal's photographs of the session was published as Fleetwood Mac in Chicago: The Legendary Chess Blues Session, January 4, 1969.  The book also contains forwards by session producers Marshall Chess and Mike Vernon and texts by Robert Schaffner and some of the participating musicians.

Critical reception

Writing in Rolling Stone in 1976, Greil Marcus said, "Thanks to the near-permanent success of the current Fleetwood Mac LP, virtually all the band's pre-Warner Bros. material – featuring guitarists Peter Green, Danny Kirwan and Jeremy Spencer – is back on the market. The best stuff is to be found on Fleetwood Mac in Chicago (Sire), a double album cut in '69 at the Chess studios, with real-life black bluesmen sitting in.... The Fleetwood Mac that cut this album was a rough, derivative band, full of enthusiasm and committed to their music... The shade of Elmore James smiled on the band, and never more so than on Chicago..."

AllMusic said, "Put together on short notice, and recorded in one day, the sessions have something of a ramshackle feel, but the energy of the performances transcends any shortcomings on this date...." "Given that the Peter Green-led Fleetwood Mac was already deeply rooted in Chicago blues, the project proved to be a natural for the group..."

Robert Christgau wrote, "Knowledgeable song selection, expressive playing – especially by Peter Green, who filters B.B. King through Santo & Johnny with a saxophonist's sense of line – and lots of help from Otis Spann, Willie Dixon, Shakey Horton, and others makes the thinness of the singing seem like a tribute to a new tradition."

On Analog Planet, Michael Fremer said, "Whatever you think of the blues, you gotta love the sound of these recordings, and more importantly the spirited playing as the veterans join in the fun of playing with the white youngsters from across the sea. These are jams – surprisingly tight ones – with snippets of producer Mike Vernon's communication between the recording booth and the studio left in between the music to help give you an indication of how the tunes were conceived."

Track listing

Blues Jam at Chess
Side A
"Watch Out" (Peter Green) - 4:20 - vocals: Peter Green
"Ooh Baby" (Howlin' Wolf) - 4:05 - vocals: Peter Green
"South Indiana" (take 1) (Walter Horton) - 3:21 - instrumental
"South Indiana" (take 2) (Walter Horton) - 3:46 - instrumental
"Last Night" (Little Walter Jacobs) - 5:01 - vocals: Peter Green
"Red Hot Jam" (Peter Green) - 6:02 - instrumental
Side B
"I'm Worried" (Elmore James) - 3:46 - vocals: Jeremy Spencer
"I Held My Baby Last Night"  (Elmore James, Jules Taub) - 5:16 - vocals: Jeremy Spencer
"Madison Blues"  (Elmore James) - 4:55 - vocals: Jeremy Spencer
"I Can't Hold Out" (Elmore James) - 4:48 - vocals: Jeremy Spencer
"I Need Your Love" (Walter Horton) - 4:31 - vocals: Shakey Horton
"I Got the Blues" (Walter Horton) - 3:59 - vocals: Shakey Horton
Side C
"World's in a Tangle" (Jimmy Rogers) - 5:25 - vocals: Danny Kirwan
"Talk With You" (Danny Kirwan) - 3:27 - vocals: Danny Kirwan
"Like It This Way" (Danny Kirwan) - 4:24 - vocals: Danny Kirwan
"Someday Soon Baby" (Otis Spann) - 7:36 - vocals: Otis Spann
"Hungry Country Girl" (Otis Spann) - 5:46 - vocals: Otis Spann
Side D
"Black Jack Blues" (J. T. Brown) - 5:08 - vocals: J.T. Brown
"Everyday I Have the Blues" (Memphis Slim) - 4:54 - vocals: Jeremy Spencer
"Rockin' Boogie" (Jeremy Spencer) - 3:57 - instrumental
"Sugar Mama" (Howlin' Wolf) - 6:08 - vocals: Peter Green
"Homework" (Dave Clark, Al Perkins) - 3:20 - vocals: Peter Green

Blues Jam in Chicago, Volume One
"Watch Out"
"Ooh Baby" 
"South Indiana" (take 1) 
"South Indiana" (take 2) 
"Last Night" 
"Red Hot Jam" (take 1) - instrumental *
"Red Hot Jam" (take 2) 
"I'm Worried" 
"I Held My Baby Last Night" 
"Madison Blues" 
"I Can't Hold Out" 
"Bobby's Rock" (Elmore James) - instrumental *
"I Need Your Love" 
"Horton's Boogie Woogie" (take 1) (Walter Horton) - vocals: Shakey Horton *
"I Got the Blues"
* Bonus track

Blues Jam in Chicago, Volume Two
"World's in a Tangle" 
"Talk With You"
"Like It This Way"
"Someday Soon Baby"
"Hungry Country Girl"
"Black Jack Blues" 
"Everyday I Have the Blues"
"Rockin' Boogie"
"My Baby's Gone" (David Edwards) - vocals: Honeyboy Edwards *
"Sugar Mama" (take 1) - vocals: Peter Green *
"Sugar Mama" (take 2)
"Homework" 
"Honey Boy Blues" (David Edwards) - instrumental *
"I Need Your Love" (take 1) (Jimmy Rogers) - vocals: Shakey Horton *
"Horton's Boogie Woogie" (take 2) - vocals: Shakey Horton *
"Have a Good Time" (Walter Horton) - vocals: Shakey Horton *
"That's Wrong" (Walter Horton) - vocals: Shakey Horton *
"Rock Me Baby" (Lil' Son Jackson) - vocals: Shakey Horton*
* Bonus track

Personnel
Fleetwood Mac
 Peter Green – guitar, vocals
 Jeremy Spencer – guitar, vocals
 Danny Kirwan – guitar, vocals
 John McVie – bass 
 Mick Fleetwood – drums

Chicago blues artists
 Otis Spann – piano, vocals
 Willie Dixon – upright bass
 Walter "Shakey" Horton – harmonica, vocals
 J. T. Brown – tenor saxophone, vocals
 Buddy Guy – guitar
 David "Honeyboy" Edwards – guitar, vocals
 S.P. Leary – drums

Production
 Produced by Mike Vernon and Marshall Chess
 Engineering: Stu Black
 Photography: Jeff Lowenthal

Charts

References 

1969 albums
Fleetwood Mac albums
History of Chicago
Albums produced by Mike Vernon (record producer)
Epic Records albums
Sire Records albums
Blue Horizon Records albums
Covers albums
Albums produced by Marshall Chess